Lu Haojie (born 3 August 1990) is a Chinese weightlifter. He competed for China at the 2012 Summer Olympics, winning the silver medal. At the 2012 Chinese National Games, Lu Haojie posted 175 kg in the snatch, and went on to win the National Games, placing ahead of Lu Xiaojun.

He won the silver medal at the 2012 Summer Olympics in the men's 77 kg category with a total of 360 kg. He injured his left elbow during his second snatch attempt of 175 kg, but went on to lift 190 kg in the clean and jerk to secure a silver medal.

See also
China at the 2012 Summer Olympics#Weightlifting

References

Chinese male weightlifters
Weightlifters at the 2012 Summer Olympics
Olympic weightlifters of China
Olympic silver medalists for China
1990 births
Living people
Olympic medalists in weightlifting
Sportspeople from Suzhou
Medalists at the 2012 Summer Olympics
Weightlifters from Jiangsu
People from Zhangjiagang
21st-century Chinese people